The following list comprises works by American composer Michael Daugherty, arranged by musical forces required.

Compositions

Orchestra
To the New World (2019)
Night Owl (2018)
Rio Grande (2015) 
American Gothic (2013)
Lost Vegas (2012)
Radio City: Symphonic Fantasy on Arturo Toscanini and the NBC Symphony Orchestra (2011)
Mount Rushmore for chorus and orchestra (2010)
Letters from Lincoln for baritone and orchestra (2009)
Achilles Heel from Troyjam (2009)
Troyjam for Narrator and Orchestra (2008)
March of the Metro (2008)
Ghost Ranch (2005)
Above Clouds from Ghost Ranch (2005)
Tell My Fortune (2004)
Time Machine for three conductors and orchestra (2003)
Pachelbel's Key for youth orchestra (2002)
Philadelphia Stories (2001)
Motor City Triptych (2000)
Sunset Strip (1999)
Route 66 (1998)
Leap Day for youth orchestra (1996)
Metropolis Symphony (1988–1993)
Flamingo (1991)

String orchestra
Octet: Mendelssohn-Daugherty (2002)
Strut (1989)

Concerti with orchestra
Tales of Hemingway for cello and orchestra (2015)
Dreamachine for solo percussion and orchestra (2014)
Fallingwater for violin and string orchestra (2013)
Reflections on the Mississippi for tuba and orchestra (2013)
Passage to Petra for bassoon, strings and percussion (2011)
Trail of Tears for flute and orchestra (2010)
Gee's Bend for electric guitar and orchestra (2009)
Deus Ex Machina for piano and orchestra (2007)
Bay of Pigs for classical guitar and string orchestra (2006)
Above Clouds for four horns and orchestra (2005)
Crystal for flute, alto flute, and chamber orchestra, from Tell My Fortune (2004)
Once Upon a Castle: Symphonie Concertante for organ and orchestra (2003/rev.2015)
Fire and Blood for violin and orchestra (2003)
Raise the Roof for timpani and orchestra (2003)
Tell-Tale Harp for two harps and orchestra, from Philadelphia Stories (2001)
UFO for solo percussion and orchestra (1999)
Hell's Angels for bassoon quartet and orchestra (1998–99)
Spaghetti Western for English horn and orchestra (1998)
Le Tombeau de Liberace for piano and orchestra (1996)
Mxyzptlk for 2 flutes and chamber orchestra, from Metropolis Symphony (1988)

Symphonic band, concert band, or wind ensemble
Made for You and Me: Inspired by Woody Guthrie for adaptable band (2020)
Of War and Peace (2017)
Rio Grande (2015)
Winter Dreams (2015)
Vulcan (2014)
On the Air (2012)
Lost Vegas (2011)
Bells for Stokowski (2002)
Alligator Alley (2002)
Red Cape Tango (1999)
Niagara Falls (1997)
Bizarro (1993)
Desi (1991)

Concerti with symphonic band or symphonic winds
Reflections on the Mississippi for tuba and symphonic band (2015)
The Gospel According to Sister Aimee for organ, brass and percussion (2012)
Raise the Roof for timpani and symphonic band (2007)
Ladder to the Moon for solo violin, wind octet, double bass and percussion (2006)
Brooklyn Bridge for clarinet and symphonic band (2005)
Rosa Parks Boulevard for three trombones and symphonic band (2001)
UFO for solo percussion and symphony band (2000)
Dead Elvis for solo bassoon and chamber ensemble (1993)

Chorus
Writ in Water for chorus (2018)
Mount Rushmore for chorus and orchestra (2010)

Voice and orchestra or chamber ensemble
This Land Sings: Inspired by the Life and Times of Woody Guthrie for soprano, baritone and chamber ensemble (2016)
Letters from Lincoln for baritone and orchestra (2009)
TROYJAM for narrator and orchestra (2008)
What's That Spell? for two sopranos and chamber ensemble (1995)

Voice and wind ensemble or symphonic winds
Songs from a Silent Land for soprano and symphonic winds (2019)
Labyrinth of Love for soprano and chamber winds, piano, double bass and percussion (2013)

Opera
Jackie O (1997)

Large chamber ensemble
Steamboat for Trombone Choir (2014)
The Gospel According to Sister Aimee for organ, brass and percussion (2012)
Passage to Petra for solo bassoon, strings and percussion (2011)
Asclepius Fanfare for brass and percussion (2007)
Ladder to the Moon for solo violin, wind octet, double bass and percussion (2006)
Timbuktuba for euphonium/tubas ensemble and percussion (1996)
What's That Spell? for two sopranos and chamber ensemble (1995)
Motown Metal for brass and percussion (1994)
Snap! (1987)
Blue Like an Orange (1987)

Small chamber ensemble
The Water is Wide for 5 trumpets and organ (2018)
The Old Man and the Sea for Cello, Violin and Piano (2016)
The Diaries of Adam and Eve for violin, double bass and optional narrators (2016)
The Lightning Fields for trumpet and piano (2015)
Prayer for two horns and piano (2014)
Steamboat for saxophone quartet (2014)
Bay of Pigs for acoustic guitar and string quartet (2006)
Diamond in the Rough for violin, viola and percussion (2006)
Elvis Everywhere for saxophone quartet and pre-recorded sound or three Elvis Impersonators (2006)
Regrets Only for violin, cello and piano (2006)
Walk the Walk for baritone saxophone (or bass clarinet or contrabassoon) and percussion (2005)
Crystal, from Tell My Fortune for flute, alto flute and piano (2004)
The High and the Mighty for piccolo and piano (2000)
Used Car Salesman for percussion quartet (2000)
Sinatra Shag for solo violin, bass clarinet, cello, piano and percussion (1997)
Yo amaba a Lucy (I Loved Lucy) for flute and classical guitar (1996)
Lounge Lizards for two pianos and two percussion (1994)
Dead Elvis for solo bassoon and chamber ensemble (1993)
Lex for electric violin, four percussion, timpani, synthesizers and electric bass (1991)
Firecracker for solo oboe, flute (piccolo), bass clarinet, violin, cello, percussion and piano (1991)
Viola Zombie for two violas (1991)
Bounce for two bassoons (1988)

Percussion ensemble
Used Car Salesman for percussion quartet (2000)
Shaken Not Stirred for three percussion and electric bass (1994)

String quartet and pre-recorded sound
Paul Robeson Told Me for string quartet and pre-recorded sound (1994)
Elvis Everywhere for string quartet and pre-recorded sound or three Elvis Impersonators and Baritone Saxophone (1993)
Sing Sing: J. Edgar Hoover for string quartet and pre-recorded sound (1992)

Solo instrument
Viva for violin (2014)
Buffalo Dance for piano (2012)
Everybody's Got the Right for piano (2012) 
An Evangelist Drowns for organ (from The Gospel According to Sister Aimee for organ, brass and percussion) (2012)
Venetian Blinds for piano (2002)
Monk in the Kitchen for piano (2001)
Jackie's Song for cello (1996)
Piano Plus for piano (1985)

References 

Lists of compositions by composer